Meredith Evans is an archivist, historian and scholar and the director of the Jimmy Carter Library and Museum in Atlanta.  Her work focuses on the African-American experience in the United States, including the documentation of archival records from African-American churches in the Atlanta area, and the preservation of social media from recent civil rights protests such as those of the Ferguson unrest in Ferguson, Missouri after the shooting of Michael Brown.

Education
Evans attended Friends Seminary in New York and received her high school diploma in 1990.

She received a Bachelor's degree in History and a Master's degree in Library Science from Clark Atlanta University. She holds a Master's degree in Public History from North Carolina State University.

Her doctorate in Library and Information Science is from the University of North Carolina at Chapel Hill.  Her dissertation focused on the records management and retention practices of African-American churches in the Southern United States.

Dr. Evans has taught classes in library, archives and information sciences including Clark Atlanta University and the University of North Carolina at Charlotte.

Career
While a curator at Atlanta University Center, Evans was instrumental in obtaining an Andrew W. Mellon Foundation grant for the digitization of the papers of Martin Luther King Jr. As an archivist, she co-taught a workshop in archival preservation titled “The Lessons of Pilgrim Baptist Church: Preventing the Loss of Your Heritage,” which addressed the care and preservation of church archives and records in the wake of a tragic fire that destroyed the historic Pilgrim Baptist Church in Chicago in early 2006.

At George Washington University, she served as the Director of Special Collections.

Later, at the University of North Carolina at Charlotte, Evans held the title of Associate University Librarian for Special Collections & Digital Programs.

Meredith Evans was formerly the Associate University Librarian at Washington University in St. Louis. During her tenure there, the WUSTL library was active in the creation of Documenting Ferguson, a community-curated digital repository documenting the unrest in Ferguson, Missouri after the murder of Michael Brown at the hands of police. She has written about the impact of new archival methods to "collect the now" as related to born-digital materials that are preserved by modern archives in a post-custodial era of archival science. In 2014, WUSTL joined with the University of California at Riverside and the Maryland Institute for Technology in the Humanities at the University of Maryland, College Park, and later received a Mellon foundation grant to create Documenting the Now: Supporting the Scholarly Use and Preservation of Social Media Content, an initiative to ethically collect and preserve Twitter feeds around topics of social justice for future scholarly research.

In November, 2015 Dr. Evans was named as the new director of the Jimmy Carter Presidential Library and Museum in Atlanta.

In April, 2017 Evans was elected as Vice President/President Elect of the Society of American Archivists.

Selected bibliography
 Evans, Meredith Rachelle, MSLS, MA (2006) Recordkeeping Practices in Selected Atlanta Area Black Churches. University of North Carolina: Chapel Hill.
 Evans, Meredith R., PhD (2007) The Digitization of African American Publications, The Serials Librarian, 53:1-2, 203-210, DOI: 10.1300/J123v53n01_16
 Evans, Meredith R. (2015) Modern Special Collections: Embracing the Future While Taking Care of the Past, New Review of Academic Librarianship, 21:2, 116-128. DOI:10.1080/13614533.2015.1040926

Awards
Association of Research Libraries Leadership Fellowship (2013)

References

External links
 Jimmy Carter Presidential Library and Museum official site
 Documenting Ferguson site
 Documenting the Now (DocNow) site

Living people
Female archivists
American archivists
American librarians
American women librarians
University of North Carolina alumni
Clark University alumni
African-American librarians
Year of birth missing (living people)
Presidents of the Society of American Archivists
North Carolina State University alumni
Friends Seminary alumni
21st-century African-American people
21st-century African-American women
Washington University in St. Louis people
George Washington University people